Modern Operating Systems is a book written by Andrew Tanenbaum, a version (which does not target implementation) of his book Operating Systems: Design and Implementation. It is now in its 4th edition, published March 2014, written together with Herbert Bos.

Modern Operating Systems (mostly known as MOS) is a popular book across the globe and includes the fundamentals of an operating system with small amounts of code written in autonomous C language. MOS describes many scheduling algorithms.

Books on operating systems
Computer science books
1992 non-fiction books